Karen Brems Kurreck (born June 13, 1962 in Urbana, Illinois) is a graduate of Urbana High School and the University of Illinois. As a racing cyclist, she is best known for winning the inaugural women's individual time trial at the 1994 UCI Road World Championships in Catania, Italy. Kurreck represented the United States at the 2000 Summer Olympics in Sydney, Australia.

Prior to her cycling career, Brems was a collegiate gymnast at the University of Illinois where in 1984 she became the first Illini athlete to be named as the school’s Athlete of the Year and the Big Ten Conference Medal of Honor Award winner in the same season.

Since 2011, Brems has concentrated on the Cyclocross discipline. She won two consecutive 50+ Masters  World Championships in 2012 and 2013, and several Masters 50+ championship jerseys at  US Cross Nationals including: in 2013 (Master 50-54) in Louisville, Kentucky; in 2015 (Master 50-54) in Austin, Texas; in 2016 (Master 50-54) in Asheville, North Carolina; and in 2018 (Master 55-59) in Reno, Nevada.

References

1962 births
Living people
American female cyclists
Cyclists at the 2000 Summer Olympics
Olympic cyclists of the United States
People from Urbana, Illinois
UCI Road World Champions (women)
21st-century American women